Constituent Assembly elections were held in Bolivia on 2 July 2006, alongside a referendum on increased regional autonomy. The ruling Movement for Socialism won 137 of the 255 seats.

Results

References

Bolivia
2006 in Bolivia
Elections in Bolivia
July 2006 events in South America